Maximiliano Scapparoni (born 13 January 1989) is an Argentine retired footballer who played as a goalkeeper.

Scapparoni retired at the end of the 2017-18 season.

References

External links
 Maximiliano Scapparoni at Football-Lineups
 

Living people
1989 births
Sportspeople from Buenos Aires Province
Association football goalkeepers
Argentine footballers
Argentine expatriate footballers
Club Atlético Los Andes footballers
Ñublense footballers
Independiente Rivadavia footballers
Chilean Primera División players
Primera Nacional players
Argentine expatriate sportspeople in Chile
Expatriate footballers in Chile